Anta Eshq  or Enta Eshq  or Enta Ishq (You Are Love) is an album by Qatari singer Fahad Al Kubaisi. The album was released on March 8, 2017 (Without CDs) on YouTube, iTunes Store and other electronic musical stores . On the 15th of the same month, in the famous Kuwaiti television program "Hamad Show", presented by the television presenter Hamad Al-Ali, known as "Hamad Qalam," Fahad talked about the details of the album and then distributed the album CDs to the audience present for the episode as a surprise to his Kuwaiti audience. Fahad recorded album songs in his studio in Doha and other studios in Bahrain, UAE, Egypt and Turkey. In Turkey, he collaborated with Turkish musicians in recording most of the album's songs as Rouh and Eshtaqt Lek.

The opening song Anta Eshq made more than 1.5 million views on YouTube after the release of the album in just three days. Fahad recorded this song in a musical form of rapping  with Latin music and Khaliji music

Track listing
"Anta Eshq " (You are love) - 4:16 
"Eshtaqt Lek" (I missed you) - 5:52
"AlHadh Al Aqshar" (Bad Luck) - 3:55
"Allah Yekther"  -  4:08
"Kul Al Zeyadah"  - 3:25
"Naam Aasheq" (Yes I am a lover) - 3:54
"Ya Baadi"  - 5:11 
"Rouh" Eth'hab (Go) - 4:45 
"Aheb Al Lail" (I love night) - 5:30
"Enqelab" (coup) - 5:09
"Feek Al Shabah"  - 4:16

Personnel
Fahad Al Kubaisi - lead vocals
Ismail - Buzuq
Ilter, Erdem - Guitar
ceyhun -Accordion
Goksun -Soprano saxophone, Tenor saxophone
Omar, Pop, Ibrahim Hassan, Hani Al Dosari -Percussion
Ergun - Clarinet
Aytac, Majed Soror -Qanun
Islam Al Qasabji -Oud
Ahmed khairi - Ney

Production
Fahad Al Kubaisi - record producer, Executive producer
Abdullah Al Manaai -record producer
Seeroos Eisa -musical arranger
Muhannad Saif -musical arranger
Khalid Ezz -musical arranger
Hesham Al Sakeran - musical arranger

References
Anta Eshq Album on Apple music
Fahad Al Kubaisi becomes the first singer from Gulf to get nominated for Grammy Awards - The Peninsula Newspaper

2017 albums
Fahad Al Kubaisi albums
Arabic-language albums